dGa'-ldan may refer to

Ganden Monastery near Lhasa, Tibet
Gandantegchinlen Monastery, Ulaanbaatar, Mongolia
Galdan Boshugtu Khan, a Dsungar ruler of the 17th century.